The following are pendant portraits by Frans Hals painted on the occasion of a marriage or marriage anniversary. This list is a subset of the list of paintings by Frans Hals, showing the marriage portraits side by side.

References
List of paintings by Frans Hals

 List
Hals, Frans